Gabriel Fauré wrote two compositions titled Fantaisie:
 Fantaisie, Op. 79 for flute and piano (1898)
 Fantaisie, Op. 111 for piano and orchestra (1918)